Ken Page (born January 20, 1954) is an American actor and singer. Page created the role of "Ken" in the original Broadway production of Ain't Misbehavin', and played the role of "Old Deuteronomy" in both the original Broadway and filmed stage productions of Cats. Page is also known as the voice for Oogie Boogie in The Nightmare Before Christmas franchise.

Early life
Kenneth Page was born and raised in St. Louis, Missouri. He was raised Catholic by his mother, Gloria and his step-father, Garvin Gilstrap. He attended St. Bridget of Erin and St. Nicholas elementary schools. While attending St. Nicholas, he was inspired by a teacher and an older cousin to pursue theater. He subsequently graduated from Bishop DuBourg High School in 1973. From there he attended Fontbonne College in Clayton, Missouri on a full scholarship and majored in theater.

Career

Page began his career in the chorus of The Muny outdoor theater in St. Louis. After making his Broadway debut in The Wiz, Page played Nicely-Nicely Johnson in the all-black revival of Guys and Dolls (Theatre World Award). He was then featured in the original cast of the Fats Waller musical revue, Ain't Misbehavin' (Drama Desk Award), a role he reprised in the 1982 television broadcast. He also returned to the show in its 1988 Broadway revival. In 1982, he played Old Deuteronomy in Cats, returning to the part in the 1998 video release. He also has the distinction of playing God twice: in Randy Newman's Faust at La Jolla Playhouse and Goodman Theatre and in Stephen Schwartz's Children of Eden (West End). Page frequently acts in shows at The Muny, with appearances including Jesus Christ Superstar, Aida, The Wizard of Oz, Les Misérables, My One and Only, and Little Shop of Horrors.

Besides The Nightmare Before Christmas, Page's major film credits include All Dogs Go to Heaven and Torch Song Trilogy, as well as Dreamgirls. His TV credits include guest roles on shows such as Charmed and Touched by an Angel, as well as various movies and specials.

In later years, Page has developed and performed his cabaret-singer show, Page by Page, and directed various regional and touring productions. Page was the voice of the notorious talking plant Audrey II in the Muny's production of Little Shop of Horrors. He also  reprised the role of Old Deuteronomy in the Lubbock Moonlight Musicals production of Cats in Lubbock,  TX.

He regularly reprises his role as Oogie Boogie in several other Disney productions such as the fireworks display HalloWishes at Walt Disney World's Magic Kingdom, its sister show, Halloween Screams at Disneyland, the Haunted Mansion Holiday (also at Disneyland), the Hocus Pocus Villain Spelltacular (at Magic Kingdom) and subsequent video games including The Nightmare Before Christmas: The Pumpkin King, The Nightmare Before Christmas: Oogie's Revenge and the Kingdom Hearts series.

Personal life 

In a 2015 interview with St. Louis Magazine, Page said that he identifies as gay.

Filmography

Film

Television

Video games

Theatre

Broadway
{{columns-list|colwidth=30em|
 1975: The Wiz as Lion 
 1976: Guys and Dolls as Nicely-Nicely Johnson 
 1978: Ain't Misbehavin' as Ken
 1982: Cats as Old Deuteronomy 
 1988: Ain't Misbehavin''' as Ken
 1999: It Ain't Nothin' But the Blues as Performer
}}

Off Broadway

Regional

The Muny-St. Louis

Other
 1979: Ain't Misbehavin' as Performer 4 (US Tour)
 1991: Children of Eden as Father/God (West End)
 2018: The Nightmare Before Christmas in Concert at the Hollywood Bowl as Oogie Boogie
 2019: The Little Mermaid: An Immersive Live-to-Film Concert Experience as Sebastian

Discography
SinglesPage by Page'' (2008)

Soundtrack

Awards and nominations

References

External links

 
 
 

African-American male actors
American male film actors
American male stage actors
American male video game actors
American male voice actors
Cabaret singers
Drama Desk Award winners
Living people
Male actors from St. Louis
Singers from Missouri
American male musical theatre actors
American gay actors
LGBT African Americans
LGBT people from Missouri
1954 births
African-American Catholics
20th-century African-American male singers
21st-century African-American male singers
Fontbonne University alumni